Dinguiraye (N’ko: ߘߌ߲ߞߌߙߊߦߌ߫ ) is a small town in northern Guinea, known for its large mosque which until recently was thatched. As of 2014 it had a population of 47,250 people.

History

The town and its mosque hold special historical importance; El Hadj Umar Tall founded the Toucouleur Empire in the city and initially made it his capital. Al-Hadj Umar also built the city's large mosque at this time and the city served as a staging ground for his 1850 jihad.

Notable people
Saïdou Bokoum (1945-) - writer

References

Sub-prefectures of the Faranah Region
Toucouleur Empire